Nihel Bouchoucha ( Landolsi, born 1 July 1995) is a Tunisian judoka. She is a two-time medalist at the African Games. She is also a two-time gold medalist at the African Judo Championships.

Career 

She won one of the bronze medals in her event at the 2018 African Judo Championships held in Tunis, Tunisia. In 2019, she won the gold medal in the women's 70 kg event at the African Judo Championships held in Cape Town, South Africa. A few months later, she was eliminated in her first match in the women's 70 kg event at the 2019 World Judo Championships held in Tokyo, Japan.

At the 2021 African Judo Championships held in Dakar, Senegal, she won the gold medal in her event. She also competed in the women's 70 kg event at the 2021 World Judo Championships held in Budapest, Hungary. She was eliminated in her second match by Maria Portela of Brazil.

She competed in the women's 70 kg event at the 2020 Summer Olympics in Tokyo, Japan.

She won the silver medal in the women's 70 kg event at the 2022 Mediterranean Games held in Oran, Algeria.

Achievements

References

External links 

 

Living people
1995 births
Place of birth missing (living people)
Tunisian female judoka
African Games medalists in judo
African Games silver medalists for Tunisia
African Games bronze medalists for Tunisia
Competitors at the 2015 African Games
Competitors at the 2019 African Games
Judoka at the 2020 Summer Olympics
Olympic judoka of Tunisia
Competitors at the 2022 Mediterranean Games
Mediterranean Games silver medalists for Tunisia
Mediterranean Games medalists in judo
21st-century Tunisian women